This is a list of Bangladeshi photographers, people from or associated with Bangladesh and are notable for their excellence in the field of photography:

A
 Aftab Ahmed
 Gazi Nafis Ahmed
 Naib Uddin Ahmed
 GMB Akash
 Taslima Akhter
 Shahidul Alam
 K M Asad

B
 Manzoor Alam Beg
 Andrew Biraj

G
 Hasan Saifuddin Chandan

H
 Amanul Haque
 Mohammad Rakibul Hasan
 Anwar Hossain
 Mohammad Ponir Hossain

K
 Sayeeda Khanam

M
 Nasir Ali Mamun
 Fabeha Monir

P
 Sarker Protick

R
 Probal Rashid

S
 Jashim Salam
 Bijon Sarkar

T
 Rashid Talukder

W
 Munem Wasif

Z
 Munir Uz Zaman

References

Bangladeshi
Photographers
Photography in Bangladesh